The Courage Cornwall/Devon League 1988–89 was the second full season of rugby union within the Cornwall/Devon League with six teams from Devon and five from Cornwall. Each team played one match against each of the other teams in the league, playing a total of ten matches with five at home and five away. Penryn, the champions, were promoted to the Courage Western Counties league for season 1989–90, Paignton and Exmouth relegated to Courage Devon One and Hayle relegated to Courage Cornwall One.

Participating teams and locations

Table

Sponsorship
The Cornwall/Devon League was part of the Courage Clubs Championship and was sponsored by Courage Brewery

See also

 English rugby union system

References

1988–89 in English rugby union leagues
Tribute Cornwall/Devon